The 138th Mixed Brigade was a unit of the Spanish Republican Army that took part in the Spanish Civil War.

History 
The unit was created in May 1937 from elements of the 2nd Division of the People's Army of Catalonia, under the command of the Lieutenant Colonel of the Civil Guard Mauricio García Ezcurra. The brigade was assigned to the 33rd Division, initially heading to the Andalusian front and later, to the front of Guadalajara, where it spent the rest of the conflict.

Between 5 and 7 April 1938 it took part in the fighting that took place in the so-called "Vertice Cerro", in the province of Cuenca, facing fourteen enemy assaults against its positions that left the brigade seriously damaged. A few months later, in August, the 138th Mixed Brigade took part in various actions that took place in the Universal Mountains.

During the rest of the war it did not participate in relevant military operations.

Controls 
 Commanders
 Lieutenant colonel of the Civil Guard Mauricio García Ezcurra;
 Militia major Ramón Pastor Llorens;
 Infantry Commander José Ramos Chiva;
 Militia major José Ramón Poveda;
 Militia major Gabriel Carbajal Alcaide;

 Commissars
 Modesto Cubas Perna, of the CNT;

 Chiefs of Staff
 Infantry commander Daniel Porras Gil;
 Militia lieutenant Antonio García Manchón;

References

Bibliography 
 
  
 
 

Military units and formations established in 1937
Military units and formations disestablished in 1939
Mixed Brigades (Spain)
Military units and formations of the Spanish Civil War
Military history of Spain
Armed Forces of the Second Spanish Republic